Intel is an American semiconductor chip manufacturer.

Intel may also refer to:

 Intelligence assessment
 Intel, a fictional cartel in the 1960s BBC TV science fiction serials A for Andromeda and The Andromeda Breakthrough
 INTEL, a former Panamanian state-run telephone services company, purchased by Cable & Wireless plc in 1997
 Intelligence
 Military intelligence

See also
 Intelligence (disambiguation)

ja:インテル (曖昧さ回避)